Javed Khan is the name of:
 Javed Khan Nawab Bahadur (c. 1695–1754), Mughal official and effective regent during 1748 to 1754
 Javed Khan (actor) (born 1962), Indian film and television actor
 Javed Khan (cricketer) (born 1990), Indian cricketer who plays for Mumbai
 Javed Khan (executive), British chief executive of Barnardo's
 Javed Khan Amrohi, Indian film and television actor
 Javed Khan (politician), MLA in the government of West Bengal, India
 Javed Ahmed Khan (born 1956), politician in the All India Trinamool Congress (TMC) party
 Javed Ali Khan (born 1962), Member of the Parliament of India representing Uttar Pradesh

See also
Jawed (disambiguation)
Khan (surname)